Thymopsis is the scientific name of two genera of organisms and may refer to:

Thymopsis (crustacean), a genus of lobsters in the family Nephropidae
Thymopsis (plant), a genus of plants in the family Asteraceae